Edwin Hodgeman (born 26 June 1935) is an Australian actor. He was born in Adelaide, South Australia.

Selected filmography
 The Fourth Wish (1976) .... Simms
 Money Movers (1978) .... Nacker
 The Survivor (1981) .... Bain
 Eureka Stockade (1984, TV Mini-Series) .... Commissioner Rede
 Robbery Under Arms (1985) .... Jack Benson
 Mad Max Beyond Thunderdome (1985) .... Dr. Dealgood
 Playing Beatie Bow (1986) .... Sir
 A Sting in the Tale (1989) .... Roger Monroe
 Ebbtide (1994) .... Doctor
 Shine (1996) .... Soviet Society Secretary 
 Sun on the Stubble (1996, TV Mini-Series) .... Mr. Taylor
 Cut (2000) .... Mr. Drivett
 Black and White (2002) .... Govt. Prosecutor
 Human Touch (2004) .... Mr. Thompson
 Look Both Ways (2005) .... Jim
 Modern Love (2006) .... Old Man in motel
 Lucky Miles (2007) .... Coote
 Twin Rivers (2007) .... Old William (voice)
 Rain Shadow (2007, TV Mini-Series) .... Steve Willis
 Hey, Hey, It's Esther Blueburger (2008) .... Rabbi
 Codgers (2011) .... Les Weston
 Tracks (2013) .... Mr. Ward

References

External links

1935 births
Living people
Australian male film actors
Australian male television actors
Male actors from Adelaide
21st-century Australian male actors